Luca Michlmayr (born 23 July  2002), known by the stage name Lumix (stylized as LUM!X or Lum!x), is an Austrian-Italian DJ and music producer who lives in Italy. He is best known for the hits "Monster" (with Gabry Ponte), "The Passenger" (with Ponte & D.T.E. feat. MOKABY), and "Thunder" (with Ponte and Prezioso). He represented Austria in the Eurovision Song Contest 2022 with the song "Halo", alongside fellow Austrian vocalist Pia Maria.

Discography

Singles

Awards and nominations

References 

Austrian DJs
Austrian record producers
2002 births
Living people
Eurovision Song Contest entrants for Austria
Eurovision Song Contest entrants of 2022
Austrian expatriates in Italy
Electronic dance music DJs